Armel Tripon (born 11 August 1975) is a French sailor who finished 11th in the 2020–2021 Vendée Globe. sailing the first SCOW influenced IMOCA designed by first time design Samual Manard and build by Black Pepper Yachts.

Biography
He lives in Nantes, Loire-Atlantique. He is married with three children. His home port is La Trinité-sur-Mer.

Results

References

External links
 
 
 Vendee Campaign Website

1975 births
Living people
Sportspeople from Nantes
French male sailors (sport)
Class 40 class sailors
IMOCA 60 class sailors
French Vendee Globe sailors
2020 Vendee Globe sailors
Vendée Globe finishers
Single-handed circumnavigating sailors